Geoff Davis (born October 26, 1958) is a former U.S. Representative for Kentucky.

Geoff or Geoffrey Davis may also refer to:

 Geoff Davis (Australian politician) (born 1931), Australian politician
 Geoffrey Davis (doctor) (died 2008), Australian doctor and director of the International Abortion Research and Training Centre
Geoff Davis (director), producer of William Kelly's War

See also 
 Geoff Davies (disambiguation)
 Jeffrey Davies (disambiguation)
 Jeff Davis (disambiguation)
 Geoffrey Hart-Davis (1905–1941), South African cricketer and soldier